Pittsburg High School in Pittsburg, Contra Costa County, California, United States, is a suburban school serving Pittsburg. It has been in operation since 1924. Over 3,000 students attend the school. It is a part of the Pittsburg Unified School District. Pittsburg High School teaches grades 9–12.

Notable alumni
 Lionel Aldridge (1941–1998),  NFL defensive end (1963–73) with the Green Bay Packers and San Diego Chargers
 Eddie Hart (born 1949), Olympic gold medalist in 4 × 100 m relay at the 1972 Summer Olympics
 Shaunard Harts (b. 1978), Kansas City Chiefs (2001–04)
 The Jacka (1977–2015), Bay Area hip hop artist
 John Henry Johnson (1929–2011), NFL fullback; Pro Football Hall of Fame 1987; part of "The Million Dollar Backfield"
 Mars (b. 1980), Mexican-American hip hop artist; real name Mario Delgado
 James Page (b. 1971), James "Mighty Quinn" Page, former WBA Welterweight Champion of the World
 Richard Poe (b. 1946), actor
 Ken Simonton (b. 1979), NFL running back (2002–05)
 Joe Tafoya (b. 1978), Chicago Bears (2001–03), Seattle Seahawks (2005–06), Arizona Cardinals (2007)
 Altie Taylor (1947–2010), NFL running back; drafted by the Detroit Lions in the second round (34th overall) of the 1969 NFL Draft
 Regan Upshaw (b. 1975), NFL defensive tackle (1996–2004), drafted by the Tampa Bay Buccaneers in the first round (12th overall) of the 1996 NFL Draft

References

External links

Pittsburg High School website
Pittsburg Unified School District

Educational institutions established in 1945
High schools in Contra Costa County, California
Pittsburg, California
Public high schools in California
1945 establishments in California